Olowo Adekola Ogunoye II was a traditional ruler of Owo (Olowo of Owo), Ondo State, Nigeria, who reigned between February 1968 to November 1992 before Sir Olateru Olagbegi II was reinstated in 1993.
One of his sons, Oba Ajibade Gbadegesin Ogunoye III, was later enthroned as the Olowo of Owo, in 2019.

Reign
Ogunoye II reigned for 24 years (6 February 1968 – 22  March 1993).
He succeeded the late Olowo of Owo, Sir Olateru Olagbegi II who was dethroned on June 1966 by the then Military Governor of the Western Region, Colonel Robert Adeyinka Adebayo, as a result of his political role in a plot against the state government.
The plot was believed to have been masterminded by Pa Michael Adekunle Ajasin who was later elected as the Executive Governor of Ondo State (October 1979 – October 1983) on the platform of the Unity Party of Nigeria.

Death
Adekola Ogunoye II died on 22 March 1993 in his palace, the Olowo of Owo palace.
He was described as a man of supernatural and magical power by chief Aralepo, the oldest chief in Owo who has witnessed the reign of five different traditional rulers of Owo.

References

Nigerian traditional rulers
Yoruba monarchs
People from Owo
1992 deaths